The Alberni Valley Bulldogs are a Junior "A" ice hockey team based in Port Alberni, British Columbia, Canada. They are members of the Island Division of the British Columbia Hockey League (BCHL). They play their home games at Weyerhaeuser Arena.

History
The Bulldogs were founded as an expansion team in the British Columbia Hockey League (BCHL) in Burnaby, British Columbia, in 1998. They were moved to Port Alberni in 2002.  After being run as a community owned franchise for many years, the club was sold on July 18th, 2019.  The BCHL board of governors granted unanimous approval for Keycorp Sports & Entertainment Ltd to acquire a majority share in the Alberni Valley Bulldogs.
Joining Keycorp Sports and Entertainment are Ron Coutre of Victoria, Luke Betts of Coquitlam, Dennis See, Stefanie Weber and Tim Maclean all of Port Alberni.
Keycorp Sports & Entertainment will have leadership in the group and will oversee all hockey and business operation decisions.

Season-by-season record
Note: GP = Games played, W = Wins, L = Losses, T = Ties, OTL = Overtime Losses, Pts = Points, GF = Goals for, GA = Goals against, PIM = Penalties in minutes

NHL alumni
Casey Bailey
David Dziurzynski
Andrew Hammond
Jim Hiller
Harry Zolnierczyk

Awards and trophies

Best Defenceman (Coastal)
Doug Krantz: 2004
Brandon Janes: 2003
Dale Lupul: 2001

Bob Fenton Trophy
Kevin Ross: 2010
Jordan Kremyr: 2006

Bruce Allison Memorial Trophy
Mark MacMillan: 2010
Tyler Leibel: 1999

Joe Tennant Memorial Trophy
Nolan Graham: 2010
Jim Hiller: 2006

Vern Dye Memorial Trophy
Mitch MacMillan: 2010

See also
List of ice hockey teams in British Columbia

References

External links
Official website

British Columbia Hockey League teams
Ice hockey teams in British Columbia
Port Alberni
1998 establishments in British Columbia
Ice hockey clubs established in 1998